Campistrous is a commune in the Hautes-Pyrénées department in south-western France.

Geography
The Petite Baïse forms part of the commune's north-eastern border.

Climate

Campistrous has a oceanic climate (Köppen climate classification Cfb).

See also
 Communes of the Hautes-Pyrénées department

References

Communes of Hautes-Pyrénées